Heather Loeffler is a set decorator. Loeffler, along with production designer Judy Becker, is nominated for an Academy Award for Best Production Design for the 2013 film American Hustle.

References

External links

Living people
Set decorators
Year of birth missing (living people)
Place of birth missing (living people)